Pistol for a Hundred Coffins ((The Taste of Hate), also known as A Gun for One Hundred Graves and Vengeance) is a 1968 Italian-Spanish Spaghetti Western film written and directed by Umberto Lenzi and starring Peter Lee Lawrence.

Cast

See also
 List of Italian films of 1968
 List of Spanish films of 1968

References

External links

1968 films
1960s Italian-language films
Spanish Western (genre) films
Spaghetti Western films
1968 Western (genre) films
Films directed by Umberto Lenzi
1960s Italian films